is a town in Iburi Subprefecture, Hokkaido, Japan. It was formed on March 23, 2006, through the merger of the town of Abuta and the village of Tōya. , the town has an estimated population of 9,231, and a population density of 51 persons per km². The total area is 180.54 km².

The name of the town was derived from the nearby Lake Tōya (Tōya-ko).

G8 summit
On April 23, 2007, the town and its surrounding area was announced as the site of the 2008 summer G8 summit. Japan's former Prime Minister Shinzo Abe reportedly chose the area because of its proximity to many famous sightseeing grounds, such as Lake Tōya and Tōyako Onsen.

Famous sights
Shikotsu-Tōya National Park
Lake Tōya
Mount Usu
The Windsor Hotel Toya Resort & Spa, the main conference site of 34th G8 summit

Notable people from Tōyako
Mashiro Ayano, singer

References

External links
 
Official Website 

Towns in Hokkaido